Rajapulova is a village and major road junction in Vizianagaram district, Andhra Pradesh, India,  where National Highway 43 from Raipur meets NH 5.

Demographics
According to Indian census, 2001, the demographic details of this village is as follows:
 Total Population: 	2,315 in 493 Households.
 Male Population: 	1,136
 Female Population: 	1,179
 Children Under 6-years of age: 429 (Boys - 217 and Girls - 212)
 Total Literates: 	761

References

Villages in Vizianagaram district